Merf or MERF can refer to:

 Merchant Freighter
 Middle East Reformed Fellowship